The Beijing Municipal Administration of Prisons is an agency of the direct-controlled municipality of Beijing, operating prisons.

It is a part of the Beijing Municipal Bureau of Justice.

Directors

 Tian Jinghua - 1912–1914 - The first director of the bureau
 Wang Wenbao - 1914–1926 - He had been trained in Tokyo

Prisons

Beijing Municipal No. 1 Prison
Beijing Municipal Prison
Beijing Municipal No. 2 Prison
Beijing Women's Prison

See also
 Beijing Municipal Public Security Bureau

References

Citations

Sources 

 Kiely, Jan. The Compelling Ideal: Thought Reform and the Prison in China, 1901-1956. Yale University Press, May 27, 2014. , 9780300185942.

External links
  Beijing Municipal Administration of Prisons

Provincial-level prison administrative bureaux in China
Politics of Beijing